Edward Fraser (11 July 1881 – 21 February 1933) was a Guyanese cricketer. He played in five first-class matches for British Guiana from 1903 to 1911.

See also
 List of Guyanese representative cricketers

References

External links
 

1881 births
1933 deaths
Guyanese cricketers
Guyana cricketers